= All-Women Ultra Marathon =

Annual endurance race in Cebu, Philippines

The All-Women Ultra Marathon (AWUM) is an endurance race which is held each year in Cebu City, Philippines. As of 2013, it is the only ultra marathon which is designed especially for women.

The All-Women Ultra Marathon is planned to coincide with the annual International Women's Day in March, and usually starts at 10 p.m. on the Saturday nearest to that day.

The race is organized by the Thinktank ultra marathoners group. The aid stations at the race are sponsored and operated by volunteers from several running clubs in the area.

The first All-Women Ultra Marathon was held on March 10, 2012, and was organized by the Ungo Runners and the Cebu Ultramarathoners Club. The distance of the race is 50 Kilometers.

In 2014, 188 women participated in the race, up from 150 in 2013.
